The 2021 Pekao Szczecin Open was a professional tennis tournament played on clay courts. It was the 28th edition of the tournament which was part of the 2021 ATP Challenger Tour. It took place in Szczecin, Poland between 13 and 19 September 2021.

Singles main-draw entrants

Seeds

1 Rankings are as of 30 August 2021.

Other entrants
The following players received wildcards into the singles main draw:
  Paweł Ciaś
  Daniel Michalski
  Albert Ramos Viñolas

The following player received entry into the singles main draw as an alternate:
  Andrea Pellegrino

The following players received entry from the qualifying draw:
  Nicola Kuhn
  Alex Rybakov
  Vitaliy Sachko
  Alexey Vatutin

The following players received entry as lucky losers:
  Jesper de Jong
  Matteo Martineau

Champions

Singles

 Zdeněk Kolář def.  Kamil Majchrzak 7–6(7–4), 7–5.

Doubles

  Santiago González /  Andrés Molteni def.  André Göransson /  Nathaniel Lammons 2–6, 6–2, [15–13].

References

2021
2021 ATP Challenger Tour
2021 in Polish tennis
September 2021 sports events in Poland